Freocrossotus is a genus of longhorn beetles of the subfamily Lamiinae.

 Freocrossotus maynei Lepesme & Breuning, 1956
 Freocrossotus meridionalis Breuning, 1977
 Freocrossotus reticulatus Breuning, 1964

References

Crossotini